The Baha Men are a Bahamian junkanoo band formed in New Providence, Bahamas in 1977. They are best known for their Grammy Award-winning hit song "Who Let the Dogs Out".

History

Early years
The Baha Men formed in 1977 as High Voltage, initially playing disco and funk. They performed regularly in nightclubs and hotels in the Bahamas and self-released several albums.

In 1991, one of their tapes found its way to Atlantic Records A&R man Steve Greenberg, who signed the band to the Big Beat subsidiary, at the same time getting the band to change their name to the Baha Men.

Early success
The following year, the Baha Men released their first album, Junkanoo, which included the local hit "Back to the Island". Kalik followed in 1994, including the international hit "Dancing in the Moonlight". The band moved with Greenberg to Polygram for the 1997 album I Like What I Like and Doong Spank, released the following year. The latter sold only 700 copies in the US and the band was dropped by the label.

Greenberg then started his own label, S-Curve, and signed the band. Original vocalist Nehemiah Hield left in 1999, and was replaced by his nephew Omerit. The band was most popular in the 1990s in Japan, and their 1999 album 2 Zero 0-0 was initially only released in that country.

"Who Let the Dogs Out"
They achieved great, but short-lived, popularity with a 2000s remake of "Who Let the Dogs Out" (originally composed by Anslem Douglas), produced by Greenberg and Michael Mangini. The song was a chart success in many countries and also became a popular song at US sporting events. "Who Let the Dogs Out" also earned the band several awards: a Grammy Award in 2001 for Best Dance Recording; Billboard Music Awards for World Music Artist of the Year and World Music Album of the Year; and a Nickelodeon Kids Choice Award for Favorite Song. In 2002, they won another Kids' Choice Award for Favorite Band.

In June 2008, "Who Let the Dogs Out" was discussed on I Love the New Millennium. The Baha Men's most recent album was Ride With Me, released in 2015.

Recent years

After releasing Night & Day in the summer of 2014, the Baha Men released a Christmas Medley mixing "The Little Drummer Boy" with "Silver Bells". Their single "Off the Leash" was released digitally on 1 July 2015. On 25 October 2015, the band performed the halftime show for the New York Giants/Dallas Cowboys football game at MetLife Stadium.

In 2018, the group joined Our Last Night for a metal cover of their hit song "Who Let the Dogs Out" and, in April 2019, released a new single, "Let's Go", dedicated to the teams playing in the Final Four.

TV and film appearances

The Baha Men appeared in a special scene from Between the Lions where Leona and Theo meet them while reading some books inside the library.

They performed onstage for a Season 14 episode of The Bachelorette, which took place in the Bahamas.

The band has even made an appearance on the big screen, when they starred as themselves in the 1994 romantic comedy My Father the Hero starring Gérard Depardieu and Katherine Heigl.

Discography

Studio albums

Compilation albums

Singles

References

External links
 

Grammy Award winners for dance and electronic music
Musical groups established in 1977
Sony Music Publishing artists
Bahamian musical groups
1970s establishments in the Bahamas